The Postal Union of the Americas, Spain and Portugal (UPAEP) is a regional association of the postal authorities in Latin America, the Caribbean, the United States, Canada, Spain, and Portugal, headquartered in Montevideo. It was founded in 1911 as a restricted union of the Universal Postal Union.

History
The UPAEP's predecessors include:
 Unión Gran Colombiana (1838): Ecuador, Venezuela, and Colombia.
 Lima Convention (1848): Bolivia, Chile, Ecuador, Colombia, and Peru
 Lima Convention (1864): Bolivia, Colombia, Ecuador, Guatemala, El Salvador, Peru, and Venezuela
 Bolivarian Postal Agreement (1911): Bolivia, Colombia, Ecuador, Peru, and Venezuela

The South American Postal Congress was held on 8 January 1911 with delegates from Argentina, Bolivia, Brazil, Chile, Ecuador, Paraguay, Peru, Uruguay, and Venezuela. The union was later renamed the Panamerican Postal Congress in 1926, the American-Spanish Postal Congress in 1936, the Postal Union of the Americas and Spain in 1966, and the Postal Union of the Americas, Spain and Portugal in 1990.

Member countries
The Postal Union of the Americas, Spain and Portugal consists of the following member postal administrations:
  Argentina (Correo Argentino) (1911)
  Aruba (Post Aruba) (1993)
  Bolivia (Empresa de Correos de Bolivia) (1911)
  Brazil (Correios) (1911)
  Canada (Canada Post) (1931)
  Chile (Correos de Chile) (1911)
  Colombia (Servicios Postales Nacionales) (1911)
  Costa Rica (Correos de Costa Rica) (1921)
  Cuba (Empresa de Correos de Cuba) (1921)
  Curaçao (CPost International) (1993)
  Dominican Republic (Instituto Postal Dominicano) (1921)
  Ecuador (Correos del Ecuador) (1911)
  El Salvador (General Postal Directorate) (1921)
  Guatemala (Correo de Guatemala) (1921)
  Haiti (Post of Haiti) (1931)
  Honduras (Honducor) (1926)
  Mexico (Correos de México) (1921)
  Nicaragua (Nicaraguan Postal Service) (1921)
  Panama (Correos y Telégrafos Nacionales de Panamá) (1921)
  Paraguay (Correo Nacional Paraguayo) (1911)
  Peru (Serpost) (1911)
  Portugal (Correios de Portugal) (1990)
  Sint Maarten (Postal Services Sint Maarten) (2014)
  Spain (Correos) (1926)
  Suriname (Surinaams Postbedrijf) (1978)
  United States (United States Postal Service) (1921)
  Uruguay (Correo Uruguayo) (1911)
  Venezuela (IPOSTEL) (1911)

See also 
 Ibero-America
 Caribbean Postal Union
 Universal Postal Union

References

External links
 

Postal organizations
Universal Postal Union
Organizations established in 1911
Organizations based in Montevideo